Jagran Lakecity University (JLU) Bhopal, is a private university established under Section 2(f) of UGC Act 1956 and is based out of Bhopal, Madhya Pradesh. The university offers 50+ degree programs to more than 2500 students from 8 countries and 27 states of India.

JLU was ranked 30th best private university in India by the Education World in 2021 and also got the E-Learning Excellence for Academic Digitisation (E-Lead) Certification 2020–21, by QS I –Gauge.

History 
The institute was initially set up in 2009 as Leeds Met India, Bhopal, and was the first international campus of Leeds Metropolitan University, UK. This was the result of partnership between Jagran Social Welfare Society and Leeds Metropolitan University. In 2013, the institute was renamed to Jagran Lakecity University after it gained UGC accreditation and became a government approved state private university.

Campus 
Jagran Lakecity University Bhopal's campus is situated in 232 acres spread between 2 locations. The campus at Mugaliyachhap, is spread in 196 acres.

The Jagran Lakecity University's 14 academic blocks consist of classrooms, auditorium and labs for hands of training for the students. Pyramid houses a library, giving students access to books and journals in both physical and digital form. The campus is completely Wi-Fi enabled and secured with CCTV cameras.

JLU Student Enrichment Hub – Chandanpura, Bhopal 
It houses the only functional pyramid of the country.

The Chandanpur campus is spread in an area of 230 acres.  It has 8 academic blocks to include classrooms, Media center, 02 auditoriums and various labs. Its architectural centerpiece is a 28,000 sqft Pyramid shape library and administrative building which provides students with access to more than 35,000 books and journals. The library is subscribed to DELNET and other internet libraries and has audio/video recordings of various academic books.

Academics 
Jagran Lakecity University offers undergraduate, postgraduate, and diploma courses in Law, Economics, Engineering, Journalism, Management, Design, FilmMaking and Animation, Culinary Arts, Advertising and PR, English Literature, Public Policy, International Affairs, Psychology and Sports. The university also publishes its own journal titled "Jagran International Journal on Contemporary Research" where research papers prepared by academicians worldwide are published.

The university has MOU's with many national and international institutions including University of Lincoln, University College London, Indo Euro Synchronization, APS Mechatronik Germany, United Nations Association of Australia, RMIT University Australia, University of West Los Angeles, Imperial College London, Guizhou University China.

Schools 
Jagran Lakecity University has these 10 schools for various courses:
 School of Engineering and Technology (SOET)
 School of Law (SOL)
 School of Commerce and Economics (SOCE)
 Jagran Lakecity Business School (JLBS)
 School of Hospitality and Tourism (SOHT)
 Jagran School of Public Policy and International Affairs (JSPPIA)
 Jagran School of Journalism and Communication (JSJC)
 School of Humanities and Social Science (SOHSS)
 School of Sports Science and Physical Education (SOSSPH)
 Jagran School of Visual Arts & Design (JSVAD)

References

Private universities in India
Jagran Lakecity University
2013 establishments in India
Educational institutions established in 2013